Eight special routes of U.S. Route 82 currently exist. Three of them lie within the state of Arkansas, with five more in Texas, and one in Georgia. Seven more existed in the past but have since been decommissioned.

Texas

Wolfforth business route

Holliday business route

Business U.S. Route 82-F (Bus. US 82-F) is a business route of U.S. Route 82 that runs through the town of Holliday. The highway is concurrent with US 277 Bus. for its entire length.

Route description
Bus. US 82-F begins at an intersection with US 82/US 277 southwest of town. The highway runs through Holliday as Olive Street, sharing a short overlap with FM 368. After crossing into Wichita County the highway ends at an interchange with US 82/US 277.

Junction list

Paris business route

Business U.S. Route 82-H (Bus. US 82-H) is a business route of US 82 in the town of Paris in Lamar County, running for just over 5 miles.

Route description
Bus. 82-H begins in western Paris at an interchange with US 82 and Loop 286. The highway runs on two one-way streets (eastbound: Clarksville Street; westbound: Bonham Street) through the center of town, sharing an overlap with a business route of US 271. The highway ends an interchange in the eastern part of the city with US 82/US 271/Loop 286.

Junction list

Clarksville business route

Avery business route

Arkansas

El Dorado business route

U.S. Route 82 Business (US 82B and Hwy. 82B) is a business route of US 82 in Union County, Arkansas.

Major intersections

Felsenthal National Wildlife Refuge spur

U.S. Route 82 Spur (US 82S and Hwy. 82S) is a  spur route of US 82 in Ashley County, Arkansas.

Route description
The route is essentially a driveway for a Felsenthal National Wildlife Refuge (NWR) facility.

Major intersections

Montrose business route

U.S. Route 82 Business (US 82B and Hwy. 82B) is a  business route of US 82 in Ashley County, Arkansas.

Route description
US 82B begins at US 82 west of Montrose, a small town in Ashley County, Arkansas within the Arkansas Delta. The highway runs east through a residential area, passing a municipal park before an intersection with the Union Pacific Railroad followed by a junction with US 165 (Main Street) near city hall.

History
The highway was officially recognized by AASHTO on May 22, 2018. However, it had existed since at least 1953 as US 82 City (US 82C).

Major intersections

Georgia

Albany business route

U.S. Route 82 Business (US 82 Bus.) is a business route of US 82 that exists almost entirely within Albany. It follows North Slappey Boulevard and East Oglethorpe Boulevard through the city, and Sylvester Road east of the city. US 82 Bus. travels entirely concurrent with SR 520 Bus.; it also has a concurrency with US 19 Bus. and a brief concurrency with SR 234.

The entire length of US 82 Bus. is part of the National Highway System, a system of routes determined to be the most important for the nation's economy, mobility, and defense.

The roadway that would eventually become US 82 Bus. was established by the end of 1921 as part of SR 50 in the city. By the end of 1929, this segment of SR 50 was indicated to be under construction. By the middle of 1930, this segment had a completed hard surface. Between February 1948 and April 1949, US 82 was designated on this portion of SR 50. Between June 1960 and June 1963, the path of SR& 50 through Albany was split into SR 50N and SR 50S. SR 50N used Broad Avenue and Sylvester Road, while US 82/SR 50S used Oglethorpe Avenue and Albany Expressway. In 1968, a northeastern bypass of the main part of Albany was proposed as a northern extension of SR 333 from the interchange of US 19/SR 333 and US 82/SR 50S in the eastern part of the city to US 19/SR 3W in the northwestern part of the city. In 1973, SR 50N was redesignated as SR 50 Conn., while SR 50S was redesignated as the SR 50 mainline. The next year, the bypass in Albany was built as a freeway, but there was no indication as to what highways were designated on it. In early 1980, US 19, US 82, and SR 333 were indicated to be designated on the Albany bypass. The old path of the highways were redesignated as US 19 Bus./US 82 Bus. with SR 3 concurrent with them in the western part of the city and SR 50 concurrent with them in the southern and eastern parts of it. Later that year, SR 333 was truncated out of Albany. SR 50 was shifted onto the US 19/US 82 freeway. Its old path in the city was redesignated as SR 50 Bus. In 1988, SR 50 was truncated to Dawson. Its former path from Dawson to Jekyll Island was redesignated as part of SR 520. SR 50 Bus. was redesignated as SR 520 Bus.

Former routes

Wichita Falls business route

Stamps truck route

The route was deleted by the Arkansas State Highway Commission on September 27, 2006.

The route began at US 82 in western Stamps and run east toward downtown, before turning right onto Conlan Street. It turned left onto First Street to an intersection with AR 53. US 82T/AR 53 ran together along Central Avenue to US 82, where the route terminates.

Major intersections

Magnolia business route

U.S. Route 82 Business (US 82B and Hwy. 82B) is a former  business route of US Route 82 in Columbia County, Arkansas.

Route description
The route's western terminus was at US 371 (Main Street/Vine Avenue) near downtown Magnolia. US 82B ran east along Main Street, passing the Dr. H.A. Longino House before entering the Magnolia Commercial Historic District and circling around the Columbia County Courthouse. All three properties are listed on the National Register of Historic Places (NRHP). Continuing east, US 82B had a junction with Jackson Street, which ran north as Highway 355 and south as US 79, which provided access to Highway 19 just south of this junction. Highway 355 provided access to Magnolia Hospital and Southern Arkansas University. US 82B continued due east through a commercial area, including a strip mall and various restaurants. The route turned southeast after Fairview Street, a direction it followed until meeting US 79/US 82 where it terminated near the city limits.

History
Following construction of a new alignment US 82 in the vicinity of Magnolia, Waldo, and McNeil, the Arkansas State Highway Commission created the US 82B designation in Magnolia on May 29, 1970 along the former alignment of US 82 through downtown Magnolia. The designation was officially approved by AASHTO on June 25, 1973. It was decommissioned on May 20, 2019.

Major intersections

Tuscaloosa bypass route

Montgomery business route

Montgomery bypass route 1

Montgomery bypass route 2

Montgomery truck route

Montgomery–Prattville alternate route

Shellman spur route

State Route 50 Spur (SR 50 Spur) was a very short-lived spur route of SR 50 that existed in 1937 in the northeastern part of Randolph County. Between the beginning of April and the beginning of July, it was established from an undetermined point in Shellman north to an intersection with SR 50. By the beginning of October, it was redesignated as a southern extension of SR 41.

Albany spur route

State Route 50 Spur (SR 50 Spur) was a spur route of SR 50 that existed in the city limits of Albany, within Dougherty County. Between June 1960 and June 1963, it was established on Third Avenue from US 82/SR 50 in the far western part of the city to US 19/SR 3W. In 1980, it was decommissioned.

Albany connector route

State Route 50 Connector (SR 50 Conn.) was a connecting route for SR 50 through the city limits of Albany. The roadway that would eventually become SR 50 Conn. was established at least as early as 1919 as SR 32 from Dawson through Albany and into Sylvester. By the end of 1921, SR 50 was designated across the state. This truncated SR 32 at Ashburn. By the end of 1926, the portion of SR 50 in the eastern part of Albany had a "completed hard surface".

By the middle of 1930, from west of Albany to the Worth–Tift county line, the highway had a completed hard surface. The western half of the Dougherty County portion of the Dawson–Albany segment had a completed semi hard surface. In January 1932, the Dawson–Albany segment had a completed hard surface.

Between February 1948 and April 1949, US 82 was designated on SR 50 through the Albany area. Between June 1960 and June 1963, the path of SR& 50 through Albany was split into SR 50N and SR 50S. SR 50N used Broad Avenue and Sylvester Road, while US 82/SR 50S used Oglethorpe Avenue and Albany Expressway. In 1973, SR 50N was redesignated as SR 50 Conn., while SR 50S was redesignated as the SR 50 mainline. In 1980, the connector was decommissioned.

Albany business loop

State Route 50 Business (SR 50 Bus.) was a business route of SR 50 that existed in the city limits of Albany within Dougherty County. The roadway that would eventually become SR 50 Bus. was established at least as early as 1919 as SR 32 from Dawson through Albany and into Sylvester. By the end of 1921, SR 50 was designated across the state. This truncated SR 32 at Ashburn. By the end of 1926, the portion of SR 50 in the eastern part of Albany had a "completed hard surface".

By the middle of 1930, from west of Albany to the Worth–Tift county line, the highway had a completed hard surface. The western half of the Dougherty County portion of the Dawson–Albany segment had a completed semi hard surface. In January 1932, the Dawson–Albany segment had a completed hard surface.

Between February 1948 and April 1949, US 82 was designated on SR 50 in the Albany area. Between June 1960 and June 1963, the path of SR& 50 through Albany was split into SR 50N and SR 50S. SR 50N used Broad Avenue and Sylvester Road, while US 82/SR 50S used Oglethorpe Avenue and Albany Expressway. In 1968, a northeastern bypass of the main part of Albany was proposed as a northern extension of SR 333 from the interchange of US 19/SR 333 and US 82/SR 50S in the eastern part of the city to US 19/SR 3W in the northwestern part of the city. In 1973, SR 50N was redesignated as SR 50 Conn., while SR 50S was redesignated as the SR 50 mainline. In early 1980, US 19, US 82, and SR 333 were indicated to be designated on the Albany bypass. The old path of the highways were redesignated as US 19 Bus./US 82 Bus. with SR 3 concurrent with them in the western part of the city and SR 50 concurrent with them in the southern and eastern parts of it. Later that year, SR 333 was truncated out of Albany, and SR 50 was shifted onto the US 19/US 82 freeway in its place. Its old path in the city was redesignated as SR 50 Bus. In 1988, SR 50 was truncated to Dawson. Its former path from Dawson to Jekyll Island was redesignated as part of SR 520. SR 50 was redesignated as SR 520 Bus.

Jekyll Island connector route

State Route 50 Connector (SR 50 Conn.) was a connecting route of SR 50 that existed in the southern part of Jekyll Island within Glynn County. In 1952, SR 50 was extended to the southern part of Jekyll Island. In 1973, SR 50 was extended around the northern part of Jekyll Island. SR 50 Conn. was designated on Ben Fortson Parkway between two intersections with SR 50. In 1981, SR 50 was truncated to the southwestern part of Jekyll Island, with SR 50 Conn. being decommissioned.

See also

References

Sources

 
 
 
 
 
 

82
 
82
82
82
82